Mikhail Yuryevich Tikhonov (May 15, 1981) is a Russian actor and voice actor who contributes to dubbing characters that appear in movies, cartoons, anime, video games and more. He dubs characters that appear in notable TV shows such as Chris McClean in Total Drama, Nick Dean and Hugh Neutron in The Adventures of Jimmy Neutron: Boy Genius and more.

Biography
Tikhonov was born on May 15, 1981 in Moscow, RSFSR, Soviet Union. He entered the film industry during his youth years while the Soviet Union still existed. In 2009, he graduated from the Gerasimov Institute of Cinematography.

Filmography

Acting
 Iron Curtain-1994
 Web-1992
 Anna Karamazoff

Russian language dubbing

Animation
 Chris McClean in Total Drama
 Hugh Neutron and Nick Dean in The Adventures of Jimmy Neutron: Boy Genius
 Sunny Bridges in Class of 3000
 Cedric and Matt in W.I.T.C.H.
 Max in Max & Co
 Lexington and Puck in Gargoyles (REN TV edition)
 Professor James Moriarty in Tom and Jerry Meet Sherlock Holmes
 The Joker in "The Batman" (2004), "The Batman vs Dracula" and "The Dark Knight Returns"
 Hal Jordan in Green Lantern: The Animated Series and Batman: The Brave and the Bold
 Andy Larkin in What's with Andy? (season 1)
 Donatello and Mikey in TMNT (2003-2009)
 Sonic the Hedgehog in Sonic X (season 1)
 Sonic the Hedgehog in Sonic OVA
 Human Torch in Fantastic Four: World's Greatest Heroes
 Young Tod in The Fox and the Hound
 Jackie Chan and Valmont in Jackie Chan Adventures (4 & 5 seasons)
 Bill Cipher and Old Man McGucket in Gravity Falls
 Yakko Warner in Animaniacs (Pythagor dubbing, 2014)
Prince/Master Vegard in The Snow Queen
Boss in The Snow Queen 2
Hippie in The Snow Queen 3: Fire and Ice
 Sam I-Am in Green Eggs and Ham (TV series)
Vegard in The Snow Queen: Mirrorlands
Mr.Wilter in ChalkZone

Live action
 Peter Shepherd in Jumanji (played by Bradley Pierce)
 Mike Newton in The Twilight Saga: Eclipse (played by Michael Welch)
 Detective Lester Ybarra in Changeling (played by Michael Kelly)
 Marty in Kick-Ass (played by Clark Duke)
 Coach Barker in Avalon High (played by Craig Hall)
 Ice-Man in X-Men franchise (played by Shawn Ashmore)
 Dean Winchester in Supernatural (played by Jensen Ackles)
 Mysterio in Spider-Man: Far From Home (played by Jake Gyllenhaal)

Video games
 Ratonhnhaké:ton in Assassin's Creed III
 Riddler in Batman: Arkham Asylum
 Suhadi Sadono in Tom Clancy's Splinter Cell: Pandora Tomorrow
 Valerian Mengsk in StarCraft II: Wings of Liberty

Work as dubbing director
 American Pop
 Medicopter 117 (Season 1-3)
 Sonic X
 Hi Hi Puffy AmiYumi
 Class of 3000
 Kick Buttowski: Suburban Daredevil
 Avalon High
 Gravity Falls
 La La Land

References

External links
 

Living people
Male actors from Moscow
Russian male video game actors
Russian male voice actors
1981 births
Russian male film actors
Russian voice directors